Jeju Province officially Jeju Special Self-Governing Province (Jeju-teukbyeol-jachi-do) is divided into 2 administrative cities (haengjeong-si) and further into 7 towns (eup), 5 townships (myeon), and 31 administrative neighborhoods (haengjeong-dong). Listed below is each entity's name in English, hangul and hanja.

See also 
 List of cities in South Korea

Jeju
Jeju Province